The Four Freedoms Monument was commissioned by President Franklin D. Roosevelt following his articulation of the "Four Freedoms" in his 1941 State of the Union Address. This was yet before the Attack on Pearl Harbor and the participation of the United States in World War II. Roosevelt felt that, through the medium of the arts, a far greater number of people could be inspired to appreciate the concept of the Four Freedoms.

According to Roosevelt, the four fundamental freedoms are:
 Freedom of speech and expression
 Freedom of worship
 Freedom from want
 Freedom from fear

The statue was created by sculptor Walter Russell later that year, and was dedicated in 1943 before a crowd of 60,000 people at Madison Square Garden in New York City. It was dedicated to Colin P. Kelly, one of the first recognized American heroes of World War II. On June 14, 1944, the monument was re-dedicated in Kelly's hometown of Madison, Florida, with a speech by Governor Spessard Holland.

Other related monuments

The Four Freedoms monument in Evansville, Indiana was designed by Evansville architect Rupert Condict. It consists of four 24-foot tall, ionic Indiana limestone columns, each with the inscription on it of one of the four freedoms. Surrounding these central columns are 50 uniformly shaped blocks representing the 50 states of the United States. Each block represents a state and shows its state seal and its date of becoming a state. The monument was dedicated in 1976 in commemoration of the United States Bicentennial.

The Four Freedoms Monument of Cleveland, Ohio is located in the Tremont neighborhood. It consists of a single column, with one of the four freedoms printed on each side. On top of the column is a sculpture of two hands holding a globe of the Earth.

See also
Four Freedoms Award
Franklin D. Roosevelt Four Freedoms Park

References

Cultural history of World War II
Monuments and memorials to Franklin D. Roosevelt in the United States
Buildings and structures in Madison County, Florida
Monuments and memorials in Florida
History of human rights
Monuments and memorials in Indiana
Four Freedoms
Outdoor sculptures in Indiana
1943 sculptures